The Academy of Labour and Social Relations is a university in Russia, located in Moscow. It was founded in 1919.

References

External links

Educational institutions established in 1919
Universities in Moscow
1919 establishments in Russia